Robert Gruntal Nathan (January 2, 1894 – May 25, 1985) was an American novelist and poet.

Biography
Nathan was born into a prominent New York Sephardic family. He was educated in the United States and Switzerland and attended Harvard University for several years beginning in 1912. It was there that he began writing short fiction and poetry. However, he never graduated, choosing instead to drop out and take a job at an advertising firm to support his family (he married while a junior at Harvard). It was while working in 1919 that he wrote his first novel—the semi-autobiographical work Peter Kindred—which was a critical failure. But his luck soon changed during the 1920s, when he wrote seven more novels, including The Bishop's Wife, which was later made into a successful film starring Cary Grant, David Niven, and Loretta Young in 1947.

During the 1930s, his success continued with more works, including fictional pieces and poetry. His 1933 novel One More Spring was filmed in 1935. In 1940, he wrote his most successful book, Portrait of Jennie, about a Depression-era artist and the woman he is painting, who is slipping through time. Portrait of Jennie is considered a modern masterpiece of fantasy fiction and was made into a film, starring Jennifer Jones and Joseph Cotten.

In 1942 Nathan wrote a poem "Dunkirk: A Ballad", then became a screenwriter for MGM, where he added additional poetry to update Alice Duer Miller's poem for the film The White Cliffs of Dover (1944). He then wrote the screenplay of The Clock (1945), in which he had a cameo role. His screenplay for 3 Godfathers (1948) was rejected, but he made contributions to the screenplay of Pagan Love Song (1950). 

In January 1956 the author wrote, as well as narrated, an episode of the CBS Radio Workshop, called "A Pride of Carrots, or Venus Well-Served".

Nathan's seventh wife was the British actress Anna Lee, to whom he was married from 1970 until his death. He came from a talented family—the activist Maud Nathan and author Annie Nathan Meyer were his aunts, and the poet Emma Lazarus and Supreme Court Justice Benjamin Cardozo his cousins.

Works

Novels

 Peter Kindred, 1919
 Autumn, 1921
 The Puppet Master, 1923
 Jonah, 1925
 The Fiddler in Barly, 1926
 The Woodcutter's House, 1927
 The Bishop's Wife, 1928 (filmed in 1947)
 There Is Another Heaven, 1929
 The Orchid, 1931
 One More Spring, 1933 (filmed in 1935)
 Road of Ages, 1935
 The Enchanted Voyage, 1936 (filmed in 1946)
 Winter in April, 1938
 Portrait of Jennie, 1940  (filmed in 1948)
 They Went On Together, 1941
 The Sea-Gull Cry, 1942
 But Gently Day, 1943
 Mr. Whittle and the Morning Star, 1947
 Long After Summer, 1948 (televised on The Alcoa Hour in 1956)
 The River Journey, 1949
 The Married Look, 1950
 The Innocent Eve, 1951
 The Train in the Meadow, 1953
 Sir Henry, 1955
 The Rancho of the Little Loves, 1956
 So Love Returns, 1958
 The Color of the Evening, 1960
 The Weans, 1960,
 The Wilderness-Stone, 1961
 A Star in the Wind, 1962
 The Devil with Love, 1963
 The Fair, 1964
 The Mallott Diaries, 1965
 Stonecliff, 1967
 Mia, 1970
 The Elixir, 1971
 The Summer Meadows, 1973
 Heaven and Hell and the Megas Factor, 1975

Novel collections
 The Barly Fields, 1938 (collection containing The Fiddler in Barly, The Woodcutter's House, The Bishop's Wife, The Orchid, and There Is Another Heaven).  Introduction by Stephen Vincent Benét.
 The Bishop's Wife and Two Other Novels, 1946 Armed Services Edition, published by the Council on Books in Wartime (shortened version of The Barly Fields, containing The Bishop's Wife, The Orchid, There Is Another Heaven, and Benét's introduction)

Plays
 Jezebel’s Husband & The Sleeping Beauty, 1953 (collection of two plays)
 Juliet in Mantua, 1966

Children's books
 Journey of Tapiola, 1938
 Tapiola's Brave Regiment, 1941
 The Adventures of Tapiola, 1950 (collection containing Journey of Tapiola and Tapiola's Brave Regiment)
 The Snowflake and the Starfish, 1959
 Tappy, 1968

Screenplays
The White Cliffs of Dover, 1944 (additional poetry)
The Clock, 1945
Pagan Love Song, 1950

Nonfiction
 The Concert, 1940
 Journal for Josephine, 1943

Poetry

 Youth Grows Old, 1922
 A Cedar Box, 1929
 Selected Poems, 1935
 A Winter Tide: Sonnets and Poems, 1940
 Dunkirk: A Ballad, 1942
 Morning in Iowa, 1944
 The Darkening Meadows, 1945
 The Green Leaf, 1950
 The Married Man, 1962
 Evening Song: Selected Poems 1950-1973, 1973

Radio programs
 A Pride of Carrots or Venus Well-Served, 1956
 Report on the We'Uns, 1956

Television programs
 The Mark Twain Television Theatre, 1953.

Miscellaneous
 Two Robert Nathan Pieces, 1950 (book containing an interview with Mr. Nathan by Harvey Breit and the poem: Advice To My Son)
 "Robert Nathan Reading His Poems with Comment at His Home in Los Angeles, Calif., in April 1962", 1962 (tape reel sound recording)

References
The Married Look, Robert Nathan. New York: Alfred A. Knopf, 1950 (author bibliography)

External links
 Robert Nathan Library – "the official library"
 
 
 "A Pride of Carrots (Venus Well Served)", MP3 file at the "CBS Radio Workshop" section of Internet Archive
 
 Robert Nathan Papers. Yale Collection of American Literature, Beinecke Rare Book and Manuscript Library.

1894 births
1985 deaths
Harvard University alumni
American Sephardic Jews
20th-century American novelists
American fantasy writers
Jewish American novelists
Jewish American poets
Writers from New York City
20th-century American poets
American children's writers
American male dramatists and playwrights
American male novelists
American male poets
American male screenwriters
20th-century American male writers
Novelists from New York (state)
20th-century American screenwriters
20th-century American Jews